Jim Hurst is an American bluegrass and country guitarist. He is known primarily as an instrumentalist but has also been credited for vocals with numerous other artists as well as his solo career. Hurst has performed with musicians that include Holly Dunn, Trisha Yearwood, Sara Evans, and Missy Raines. He has also won numerous awards for his work.

Career

Hurst began his career with playing country music in the 1980s and 90s. He was the guitarist for Holly Dunn and the Rio Band where he played both nationally and internationally. He toured with Trisha Yearwood where he played acoustic and electric guitar.

Hurst joined Claire Lynch and the Front Porch String Band in 1995. During that time he met Missy Raines and they formed the duet "Jim Hurst and Missy Raines," playing together until 2000. During their time together they released two albums which won them International Bluegrass Music Awards for Guitar Player of the Year and Bass Player of the Year in both 2001 and 2002. Hurst has returned to play with Lynch for a brief time in 2015 when her guitarist Matt Wingate left her group.

Hurst also performed Sara Evans, appearing on her 1998 album No Place That Far with both acoustic guitar and vocals. He was also nominated for Guitar Player of the Year in 2015, an award presented by the International Bluegrass Music Association.

Discography

Albums
Solo albums

As part of Jim Hurst and Missy Raines

Awards and recognition

References

External links
 Jim Hurst official website

American bluegrass guitarists
American male guitarists
American country guitarists
American country singer-songwriters
Living people
Year of birth missing (living people)
American male singer-songwriters